François-Joseph Laflèche (4 October 1879 – 2 June 1945) was a Conservative member of the House of Commons of Canada. He was born in Saint-Wenceslas, Quebec and became a physician, surgeon and pharmacist.

Laflèche was educated at the Nicolet Seminary, then at school in Trois-Rivières. He earned his Bachelor of Arts degree at the Université de Sherbrooke. He was also licensed for medical practice in the American state of Maine.

He was elected to Parliament at the Richmond—Wolfe riding in the 1930 general election. After serving his only term, the 17th Canadian Parliament, Laflèche was defeated by James Patrick Mullins of the Liberals in the 1935 federal election.

In 1934, Laflèche proposed a motion to legally require Canadian voters to cast a ballot at federal elections at a time when Australia and South Africa had already enacted compulsory voting laws.

References

External links
 

1879 births
1945 deaths
Physicians from Quebec
Conservative Party of Canada (1867–1942) MPs
Members of the House of Commons of Canada from Quebec
Université de Sherbrooke alumni